The Order of Maximilian was an anti-war group active during the Vietnam War, composed of clergymen. The group took its name from the third-century Roman saint Maximilian of Tebessa, who was martyred in AD 295 for refusing to be conscripted.

See also
 List of anti-war organizations

References

1970 establishments in the United States
Anti–Vietnam War groups
Christian pacifism
Christian organizations established in 1970